Rollerskates are a five piece indie pop band from Perth, Western Australia. Their music is a mix of electronic sounds, dance music, hip-hop, rock and funk.

Biography

1998-2005: Early years

Rollerskates were formed in 1998 when Stephen Callan, David Namour (Rufus) and Jordan Johnstone (Jordy) released a 20 track recording under the name Rollerskates, essentially a collection of samples and Casio keyboards. In order to recreate the tunes live they added Moflo Leigh and Gabriel Nicotra to the band.

In 2001 the band released their first EP Tell Your Mother to Tell Her Friends. The EP was released by local record label, QStik Records and distributed nationally through MGM Distribution. The band were named as Triple J's first Australian Music 'New Wave' band for Ausmusic Month in November 2001.

The band subsequently reached the final round of Channel [V]'s Leg Up competition. They returned to the recording studio with engineer/producer Shaun O'Callaghan (Eskimo Joe/Gyroscope/John Butler Trio). The result was the EP The Movement, which was launched in March 2002 at Perth's Globe Entertainment Complex and featured support performances from on Inc and Jedi Master J from the band 28 Days.

Three songs from The Movement EP, "The Movement", "Half A Loaf of Funk - Remix" and "H.A.R.M" were added to national rotation on Triple J, and also received airplay on radio stations in Sydney, Melbourne, Brisbane and Adelaide. The music video for "The Movement" received national airplay on ABC's Rage, Channel [V] and MTV, and was awarded Best Local Music Video at the 2002 WAMi Awards.

In 2002 they performed at the Perth leg of The Big Day Out. The band then embarked on their first East Coast Tour in July 2002, playing to moderate sized crowds in Melbourne and Sydney, as well as a sell out crowd at SJ's in Newcastle, where they (for the second time) supported Machine Gun Fellatio. They then played at 'Music Business Adelaide'.

The music video for single "Polyether 1944" was played on Channel [V], Rage (ABC) and Saturday Morning Fly (ABC).

In 2003, Rollerskates received a further three nominations at the 2003 WAMi awards for Most Popular Local Original Live Act, Most Popular Local Original Live Electronic Act and Most Popular Local Original Urban Music Act. The band then performed again at the Perth Big Day Out in 2004.

2006-2007: Rekkid
The band then undertook a brief hiatus, working on new material for their debut album, Rekkid. The first single, released from the album, in early 2005 was "Gettit". Triple J placed the single on its 'Hitlist', giving it high rotation.

In May 2006 the band released the second single, "Picture Book", followed by Rekkid in October, 2007.

Band members 
 Mofloleigh - Vocals / Samples
 Jordan Johnston - guitar/vocals
 David Namour - bass
 Stephen Callan - keyboards/vocals
 Gabriel Nicotra - drums/percussion

Discography

Albums

EP's

Awards and nominations

West Australian Music Industry Awards
The Western Australian Music Industry Awards (commonly known as WAMis) are annual awards presented to the local contemporary music industry, put on by the Western Australian Music Industry Association Inc (WAM). Rollerskates won six awards.

 (wins only)
|-
| 2001
| Rollerskates
| Most Popular Original Pop Act
| 
|-
|rowspan="3"| 2002
| "The Movement" by Rollerskates
| Most Popular Original Local Music Video
| 
|-
| Rollerskates
| Most Popular Local Original Funk Act
| 
|-
| Stevie Callum (Rollerskates)
| Most Popular Male Original Instrumentalist 
| 
|-
| 2003
| Stevie Callum (Rollerskates)
| Most Popular Local Original Instrumentalist 
| 
|-
| 2006
| Gabriel Nicotra (Rollerskates)
| Best Drummer
| 
|-

References

External links 
 Official Site
 Australian Music Online

Australian indie rock groups
Western Australian musical groups